Domjulien is a commune in the Vosges department in Grand Est in northeastern France.

The town merged with Girovillers-sous-Montfort by decree dated December 13, 1972.

See also
Communes of the Vosges department

References

Communes of Vosges (department)